Plumeria, known as frangipani, is a genus of flowering plants in the subfamily Rauvolfioideae, of the family Apocynaceae. Most species are deciduous shrubs or small trees. The species variously are endemic to Mexico, Central America, and the Caribbean, and as far south as Brazil and north as Florida (United States), but are sometimes grown as cosmopolitan ornamentals in warm regions.

Names 
The genus Plumeria is named in honour of 17th-century French botanist and Catholic monk Charles Plumier, who traveled to the New World documenting many plant and animal species. Plumeria is also used as a common name, especially in horticultural circles.

The name "frangipani" comes from a 16th-century marquis of the noble Frangipani family in Italy, who created a synthetic plumeria-like perfume. Common names for plants in the genus vary widely according to region, variety, and whim, but frangipani or variations on that theme are the most common.

In eastern India and Bangladesh, plumeria is traditionally considered as a variety of the champak flower, the golok chapa (গোলোক চাঁপা), meaning the champaka that resides in the heavenly home of Sri Krishna, a Hindu god at the highest realm of heaven. The flower, considered sacred, is also known by the names gulancha and kath golap (literally, wood rose).

Taxonomy

Species 

The genus Plumeria includes about a dozen accepted species, and one or two dozen are open to review, with over 100 regarded as synonyms. Plants of the World Online lists the following:

Synonyms 
The following may be designated to the nominate subspecies of Plumeria obtusa L.:
 Plumeria clusioides Griseb. - Cuba
 Plumeria cubensis Urb.  - Cuba
 Plumeria ekmanii Urb. - Cuba
 Plumeria emarginata Griseb. - Cuba
 Plumeria krugii Urb. - Puerto Rico
 Plumeria montana Britton & P.Wilson - Cuba
 Plumeria venosa Britton - Cuba
 The following may be considered synonyms of P. obtusa var. sericifolia (C.Wright ex Griseb.) Woodson:
 Plumeria lanata Britton - Cuba
 Plumeria sericifolia C.Wright ex Griseb. - Cuba
 Plumeria trinitensis Britton - Cuba
 Plumeria tuberculata G.Lodd. - Hispaniola, Bahamas

Formerly included in genus
 Plumeria ambigua Müll.Arg.  = Himatanthus bracteatus (A.DC.) Woodson
 Plumeria angustiflora Spruce ex Müll.Arg. = Himatanthus attenuatus (Benth.) Woodson
 Plumeria articulata Vahl = Himatanthus articulatus (Vahl) Woodson
 Plumeria attenuata Benth = Himatanthus attenuatus (Benth.) Woodson
 Plumeria bracteata A.DC. = Himatanthus bracteatus (A.DC.) Woodson
 Plumeria drastica Mart. = Himatanthus drasticus (Mart.) Plumel
 Plumeria fallax Müll.Arg. = Himatanthus drasticus (Mart.) Plumel
 Plumeria floribunda var floribunda = Himatanthus articulatus (Vahl) Woodson
 Plumeria floribunda var. acutifolia Müll.Arg. = Himatanthus bracteatus (A.DC.) Woodson
 Plumeria floribunda var. calycina Müll.Arg. = Himatanthus bracteatus (A.DC.) Woodson
 Plumeria floribunda var. crassipes Müll.Arg. = Himatanthus bracteatus (A.DC.) Woodson
 Plumeria hilariana Müll.Arg. = Himatanthus obovatus (Müll.Arg.) Woodson
 Plumeria lancifolia Müll.Arg. = Himatanthus bracteatus (A.DC.) Woodson
 Plumeria latifolia Pilg. = Himatanthus obovatus (Müll.Arg.) Woodson
 Plumeria martii Müll.Arg. = Himatanthus bracteatus (A.DC.) Woodson
 Plumeria microcalyx Standl. = Himatanthus articulatus (Vahl) Woodson
 Plumeria mulongo Benth. = Himatanthus attenuatus (Benth.) Woodson
 Plumeria obovata Müll.Arg.  = Himatanthus obovatus (Müll.Arg.) Woodson
 Plumeria oligoneura Malme = Himatanthus obovatus (Müll.Arg.) Woodson
 Plumeria phagedaenica Benth. ex Müll.Arg. 1860 not Mart. 1831 = Himatanthus drasticus (Mart.) Plumel
 Plumeria phagedaenica Mart. 1831 not Benth. ex Müll.Arg. 1860= Himatanthus phagedaenicus (Mart.) Woodson
 Plumeria puberula Müll.Arg.  = Himatanthus obovatus (Müll.Arg.) Woodson
 Plumeria retusa Lam. = Tabernaemontana retusa (Lam.) Pichon
 Plumeria revoluta Huber = Himatanthus stenophyllus Plumel
 Plumeria speciosa Müll.Arg. = Himatanthus bracteatus (A.DC.) Woodson
 Plumeria sucuuba Spruce ex Müll.Arg. = Himatanthus articulatus (Vahl) Woodson
 Plumeria tarapotensis K.Schum. ex Markgr. = Himatanthus tarapotensis (K.Schum. ex Markgr.) Plumel
 Plumeria velutina Müll.Arg. = Himatanthus obovatus (Müll.Arg.) Woodson
 Plumeria warmingii Müll.Arg. = Himatanthus obovatus (Müll.Arg.) Woodson

Description 

Plumeria branches are succulent. The trunk and branches of the Plumeria species have a milky latex sap that, like many other Apocynaceae, contains poisonous compounds that irritate the eyes and skin.

Leaves 

Plumeria trees are small or low shrubs. The leaves grow at tips of their branches. Various species and cultivar have various leaf shape and arrangements. The leaves of P. alba are narrow and corrugated, whereas leaves of P. pudica have an elongated shape and glossy, dark-green color. P. pudica is one of the everblooming types with nondeciduous, evergreen leaves.

Another species that retains leaves and flowers in winter is P. obtusa; though its common name is "Singapore", it is originally from Colombia.

Flowers 
Plumeria trees flower from early summer to fall. Their blossoms grow in clusters on ends of the stems, they are made of tubular corolla with a length of  that split sharply into five rounded and waxy petals that overlap each other. These flowers come in many colours including pink, red, white,and yellow, orange, or pastel. They have separate anthers.

The flowers are highly fragrant especially at night, their scent is perceived to have smells from some flowers like jasmine, citrus, and gardenia. However, they yield no nectar. Their scent tricks sphinx moths into pollinating them by transferring pollen from flower to flower in their fruitless search for nectar.

Insects or human pollination can help create new varieties of plumeria. Plumeria trees from cross-pollinated seeds may show characteristics of the mother tree or their flowers might just have a distinct appearance.

Its fruit separate into two follicles with winged seeds.

Propagation 
Plumeria blossoms are infertile. Plants of the species may be propagated by cutting stem tips in spring, allowing them to dry at their bases, then planting in well-drained soil. These are particularly susceptible to rot in moist soil. Applying rooting hormone to the clean fresh-cut end will enable callusing.
 
Plumeria cuttings can also be propagated by grafting to an already rooted system. The Plumeria Society of America lists 368 registered cultivars of Plumeria as of 2009.

In culture 

In Southeast Asia the plumeria tree and flower are considered sacred. A relief in the Penataran temple ruins in East Java shows a plumeria tree with its distinct flower petals and skeleton-like branches. A relief in the Borobudur temple, at the west side 1st zone, also depicts  plumeria. These reliefs were created before European exploration. Borobudur was constructed in the 9th century and Penataran in the 14th century. Taken together, their dates fail to establish when plumeria came to Southeast Asia.

In Mesoamerica, plumerias have carried complex symbolic significance for over two millennia, with striking examples from the Maya and Aztec periods into the present. Among the Maya, plumerias have been associated with deities representing life and fertility, and the flowers also became strongly connected with female sexuality. Nahuatl-speaking people during the height of the Aztec Empire used plumerias to signify elite status, and planted plumeria trees in the gardens of nobles.

These are now common naturalized plants in South and Southeast Asia. In local folk beliefs, they provide shelter to ghosts and demons. They are also associated with temples in both Hindu, Jain, and Buddhist cultures.

In several Pacific islands, such as Tahiti, Fiji, Samoa, Hawaii, New Zealand, Tonga, and the Cook Islands, Plumeria species are used for making leis. In Hawaii, the flower is called melia.  In modern Polynesian culture, the flower can be worn by women to indicate their relationship status—over the right ear if seeking a relationship, and over the left if taken.

Plumeria alba is the national flower of Laos, where it is known under the local name champa or dok champa.

In Bengali culture, most white flowers, and in particular, plumeria (Bengali, চম্পা chômpa or চাঁপা chãpa), are associated with funerals and death.

Also in the Philippines, Indonesia, and Malaysia, the plumeria is often associated with ghosts and cemeteries. Yangsze Choo in her novel The Night Tiger for example described it as is “the graveyard flower of the Malays.” Plumerias often are planted on burial grounds in all three nations. They are also common ornamental plants in houses, parks, parking lots, and other open-air establishments in the Philippines. Balinese Hindus use the flowers in their temple offerings. The plumeria's fragrance is also associated with the Kuntilanak, an evil vampiric spirit of a dead mother in Malaysian-Indonesian folklores.

Indian incenses scented with Plumeria rubra have "champa" in their names. For example, nag champa is an incense containing a fragrance combining plumeria and sandalwood. While plumeria is an ingredient in Indian champa incense, the extent of its use varies between family recipes. Most champa incenses also incorporate other tree resins, such as Halmaddi (Ailanthus triphysa) and benzoin resin, as well as other floral ingredients, including champaca (Magnolia champaca), geranium (Pelargonium graveolens), and vanilla (Vanilla planifolia) to produce a more intense, plumeria-like aroma.

In the Western Ghats of Karnataka, the bride and groom exchange garlands of cream-coloured plumeria during weddings.  Red-colored flowers are not used in weddings. Plumeria plants are found in most of the temples in these regions.

In Sri Lankan tradition, plumeria is associated with worship. One of the heavenly damsels in the frescoes of the fifth-century rock fortress Sigiriya holds a five-petalled flower in her right hand that is indistinguishable from plumeria.

In Eastern Africa, frangipani are sometimes referred to in Swahili love poems.

Some species of plumeria have been studied for their potential medicinal value.

Gallery

References

External links

 
Apocynaceae genera
Flora of Central America
Flora of South America
Flora of the Caribbean
Garden plants of South America